Purshottam Dangi is an Indian Politician, member of the Indian National Congress. In the 2008 election he was elected to the 13th Vidhan Sabha from the Biaora  constituency of Madhya Pradesh. He was earlier Sarpanch for Gram Panchayat Padoniya village(1999-2008).
He is an agriculturist and resides at Biaora tehsil of Rajgarh, Madhya Pradesh. He is married to Sumitra Devi and has three daughters and one son.

References

Year of birth missing (living people)
Living people
People from Madhya Pradesh
Madhya Pradesh MLAs 2008–2013
Indian National Congress politicians from Madhya Pradesh